Route 301, also known as Terra Nova Road, is a  east–west highway on the island of Newfoundland in the province of Newfoundland and Labrador. It serves as the only road connection to the town of Terra Nova, connecting with Route 1 (Trans-Canada Highway) within Terra Nova National Park at the other end.

Route 301 is entirely a very rough dirt road, and still has yet to be paved. The route starts off with a sharp right turn followed by sharp left turn, and is a relatively straight road afterwards, with a few slight bends. There are no other communities or junctions of any kind along the highway. In 2021, Terra Nova Road was voted Worst Road in Atlantic Canada by the Canadian Automobile Association's Worst Roads list.

Major intersections

References

301